Gipsy Lake Wildland Provincial Park is a wildland provincial park in Wood Buffalo, northern Alberta, Canada. Although the Lower Athabasca Regional Plan has been adopted,  the new Gipsy-Gordon park has not been created.

Location
The park consists of three separated parcels of land surrounding Gipsy, Birch, Gordon and Shortt lakes. The remaining trail into the park is  via four-wheel drive or snowmobile. Summer access is via aircraft only.

Ecology
The park is in the Central Mixedwood subregion of the Boreal Forest natural region of Alberta. The park preserves a lake and wetland complex. Birch Lake contains a diverse wetland habitat. Birch and Gipsy lakes contain nesting sites for the American white pelican. Gordon Lake is one of the most important waterfowl breeding, moulting, and staging areas in the region. Double-crested cormorants nest on an island in Birch Lake.

Activities
The park has no developed facilities so only wildlife viewing and random backcountry camping are available. Off-highway vehicles and snowmobiles are permitted on existing trails during frozen conditions only. Aircraft access and landing in the park requires authorization. Hunting is allowed with proper permits. Fishing and boating on the lakes are permitted. The Gypsy Lake Lodge is a fly-in fishing lodge located within the park.

See also
List of Alberta provincial parks
List of Canadian provincial parks

References

External links
 

Parks in Alberta
Regional Municipality of Wood Buffalo